Sgurr a' Chaorachain (792 m) is a mountain in the Northwest Highlands, Scotland, on the remote Applecross peninsula in the North of Scotland.

A fine sandstone peak, it lies just above the high Bealach na Bà pass.

References

Mountains and hills of the Northwest Highlands
Marilyns of Scotland
Corbetts